Kancha may refer to:

Kancha, Bihar, a village in India
Kancha language, or Kunja, a Papuan language of New Guinea
Kancha Ilaiah (born 1952), Indian political theorist

See also

Canchacanchajasa, a mountain in the Andes of Peru